The Mnet Asian Music Award for Best Mixed Group was an award presented annually by CJ E&M Pictures (Mnet) from 2000 to 2009.

It was first awarded on the 2nd Mnet Asian Music Awards ceremony held in 2000; S#arp won the award for their performance in "Great!", and it is given in honor for the mixed group with the most artistic achievement in the music industry. The award continued to be given until the 11th Mnet Asian Music Awards in 2009 wherein 8Eight received the last award for their performance in "Without a Heart".

Winners and nominees

 Each year is linked to the article about the Mnet Asian Music Awards held that year.

Multiple awards for Best Mixed Group
The following lists the artist(s) who received multiple awards for Best Mixed Group from 2000 to 2009.

Notes

Sources

References

External links
 Mnet Asian Music Awards official website

MAMA Awards